Min Byeong-seon (Min Byung-sun, born 1919) was a South Korean equestrian. He competed in the individual jumping event at the 1952 Summer Olympics.

References

External links
 
 
  

1919 births
Possibly living people
South Korean male equestrians
Olympic equestrians of South Korea
Equestrians at the 1952 Summer Olympics
Place of birth missing (living people)